Michael Peter Weber (17 March 19662 January 1999) was the lead guitarist of Australian punk rockers Seminal Rats, from 1984 to 1988. Weber also worked as a technician at the Maton guitar facility. He was a member of punky power poppers Slush Puppies (1988), before joining hard rock band Hoss, between 1990 and 1992. He returned to Seminal Rats from 1992 until his death from an accidental heroin overdose, aged 32.

Biography 

Michael Weber formed a student band, Skippy, while at secondary school with Todd McNeair and Reuben Pinkster. Weber was the founding lead guitarist of Seminal Rats, a punk rock group formed in Melbourne in 1984 by Weber on guitar, Dave Balsamo on bass guitar, Mick Harley on lead vocals, McNeair on drums and Pinkster on guitar.

During 1988, with McNeair joined punky power pop group, Slush Puppies.

In 1990 Weber and McNeair founded hard rock band, Hoss.

Discography

Studio albums 

with Seminal Rats
 Omnipotent (1986) Mr Spaceman (MRSM 04)
 Life in the Necropolis 1990 Mr Spaceman (MRSM 17)
 Plectrum Muscle 1998 independent (0000)

with Hoss
 Guzzle  (1990) Au Go Go Records (ANDA 119)
 You Get Nothing (April 1992) Dog Meat (DOG 034)

Compilation albums 

with Seminal Rats
 The Essential Seminal Rats 1984-1991 (August 2007) Bang Records (BANG!-CD11)

Extended plays 

with Seminal Rats
 Grruntled a.k.a. Hot Snapper Pie (1986) Mr Spaceman (MRSM 11)

Singles 

with Seminal Rats
 "Change" on "Jesus on T.V."/"Change" (split single by Celibate Rifles/Seminal Rats) (1987) What Goes on Records (PROGO 1)
 "Call Me Animal" 1990
 "La Grande Bouffe" 1991

with Slush Puppies
 "You're so Perfect" (December 1988)

with Hoss
 "Green" (1990) Au Go Go Records (ANDA 118)
 "It's Everywhere" (February 1992) Dog Meat (DOG 033)

Other appearances 

with Seminal Rats
 "I Need Somebody" on Hard to Beat 1987
 Final Audio Blast 1990
 "Weak" on From Babylon to Brunswick 1991

References 

General
  Note: Archived [on-line] copy has limited functionality.
Specific
 

1966 births
1999 deaths
Australian guitarists
Deaths by heroin overdose in Australia
Accidental deaths in Australia
20th-century Australian musicians
20th-century guitarists
Musicians from Melbourne